William Patrick Wood (March 11, 1820 – March 20, 1903) was a colonel in the United States Army and the first Director of the United States Secret Service. He was born to James Wood and Margaret Turner in Alexandria, Virginia.

Wood enlisted in the 3rd Regular Cavalry in the Mexican-American War, leading the C Company under General Samuel Hamilton Walker. Following the war he returned to Washington and married his wife, Harriet Smith. Although raised in the Catholic Church, he became an active leader of the Know-Nothing Party.

In the years leading up to the Civil War, Wood was a conductor on the Underground Railroad, helping hundreds of former slaves escape to New England and Canada. Wood led drills in preparation for John Brown's raid on Harpers Ferry, but ultimately objected to crossing state lines under arms and withdrew from the raid. Following the outbreak of the war, Wood was appointed by Secretary of War Edwin Stanton to be superintendent of the military prisons of the District of Columbia, principally the Old Capitol Prison.

After the assassination of Abraham Lincoln, Wood was summoned back to Washington by an urgent telegram from Edwin Stanton to assist in the investigation. Following this, he was sworn in on July 5, 1865, by Secretary of the Treasury Hugh McCulloch to head the newly formed Secret Service for four years until he resigned in 1869. He was considered the best in battling financial crime, and within a year of its founding, the Secret Service had arrested over 200 counterfeiters. He died on March 20, 1903, and was buried in the Congressional Cemetery in Washington, D.C.

Further reading

References

External links
 
 Web site - muddresearch.com

1820 births
1903 deaths
United States Secret Service agents
Burials at the Congressional Cemetery
Directors of the United States Secret Service